Institute of Inorganic Chemistry Slovak Academy of Sciences (IIC SAS) belongs to Scientific Section 2, Biological and Chemical Sciences of Slovak Academy of Sciences.

History 
Institute of Inorganic Chemistry was founded in November 1952 as Commission of Inorganic chemistry by Board of Commissioners. Later, on 30 November 1953, the name was changed to Laboratory of Inorganic chemistry. The laboratory became a part of Institute of Chemical technology of Organic Compounds on 1 January 1955. Independent Institute of Inorganic Chemistry was founded on 1 January 1960 by the decision of the presidium of SAS. The institute became member of Scientific Collegium of Chemistry SAS and Scientific Collegium of Organic Chemistry and Biochemistry CSAS from 1 January 1962 until 31 March 1990. The institute has become the individual part of Slovak Academy of Sciencies since 1 April 1990.

The number of employees has changed considerably: from 7 in 1953, through 36  in 1958, 1965 – 70, 1970 – 100 and in 1980 103 employees worked for the institute. The number decreased slightly to 95 in 2014.

Research 
Initially, the research was focused on industrial demands, mainly on the aluminium production and the processing of raw inorganic materials; i. e. bentonites, refractory materials, cements, etc.

The research is currently concentrated on studying:
 relations between composition, properties, and structure of inorganic materials, e. g. progressive ceramics, molten systems, and clay minerals and its modified forms
 the thermodynamics of multicomponent systems
 the chemical reactions occurring in inorganic systems, including the phase boundaries
 the development and application of theoretical and experimental methods for structure determination and properties of matter.

Departments 
The institute is divided into 5 research departments.

Department of Ceramics 
 Head: doc. Ing. Miroslav Hnatko, PhD.
 research is focused on the relations between mechanical properties and microstructure  of oxide or non-oxide ceramic nanocomposites, etc.
  preparation of new types of composites (ceramic composites with high electrical and/or thermal conductivity, corrosion and oxidation resistant materials, luminescent materials, etc.).

source

Department of Hydrosilicates 
 Head: Ing. Helena Pálková, PhD.
 the studies of the properties, mineralogical and chemical composition of the fine fractions of raw materials – bentonites – the clays containing dominantly montmorillonite or other minerals of the smectite group
 chemical modifications and partial dissolution of montmorillonites have been studied by mainly spectroscopic methods
 novel hybrid materials based on cationic dyes and clay minerals exhibit many interesting properties, such as excitation energy transfer, photosensitization,  changes of the energy of absorbed and emitted light, optical anisotropy, etc.

source

Department of Molten Systems 
 Head: Ing. František Šimko, PhD.
 the research is aimed to physico-chemical properties of molten salts systems
 in order to understand better the relations between the properties, the composition, and the structure of inorganic melts, several parameters are studied, i. e. density, viscosity, electric conductivity,  phase equilibria, and surface tension 
 applied research is focused on solar energy accumulation, optimization of conditions for aluminium electrochemical production; then transport of heat where molten salts act as cooling media (nuclear power plants), etc.

source

Department of Theoretical Chemistry 
 Head: Mgr. Stanislav Komorovský, PhD.
 research based on the development of computational methods for treating electron correlation in molecules and solids
 computational studies of NMR and EPR parameters of organometallic, biologically and catalytically active substances
 the most importantly, combining of experimental methods (vibrational spectroscopy, neutron and X-ray structure analysis) with precise DFT calculations in the solid state.

source

Vitrum Laugaricio (Joint Glass Center) 
 Head: prof. Ing. Dušan Galusek, DrSc.
 the research covers mostly the study of processing, microstructure, and properties of polycrystalline ceramic materials and the relation between structure, composition, and properties of oxide glasses
 the development and optimalisation of new glasses for industrial applications, and corrosion of glasses by aqueous media; then polycrystalline alumina-based materials, especially liquid phase sintered (LPS) aluminas, etc.

source

List of directors 
 1953 – 1963: Mikuláš Gregor
 1963 – 1970: František Hanic
 1970 – 1982: Edmund Kanclíř
 1982 – 1990: Miroslav Zikmund
 1990 – 1991: Blahoslav Čičel
 1991 – 1995: Vladimír Daněk
 1995 – 1999: Jozef Noga
 1999 – 2013: Pavol Šajgalík
 since 2013: Miroslav Boča

References

External links 
 www.uach.sav.sk/

Slovak Academy of Sciences
1953 establishments in Czechoslovakia
Research institutes established in 1953
Chemical research institutes